The Brazilian municipal elections of 2016 took place on 2 October 2016 and on 30 October 2016 (for cities with more than 200,000 voters, where the second round is available). Electors chose mayors, vice-mayors and city councillors of all 5,568 cities of the country. The partisan conventions took place between 20 July and 5 August. The party political broadcast started on 26 August and ended on 29 September. Until 2012, on Mondays, Wednesdays and Fridays there was the broadcast for candidates to city halls, 30 minutes long. The broadcasts for candidates for city councils were broadcast on Tuesdays, Thursdays and Saturdays, also 30 minutes long. At least 97 cities had only one candidate for mayor in these elections. Besides that, 48.8% of the cities of the country didn't have more than two candidates. These were the first elections in which recently registered parties Partido da Mulher Brasileira (PMB), Rede Sustentabilidade (REDE) and Partido Novo (NOVO) participated; they were recognized by the Superior Electoral Court in 2015. Some of the most highlighted elected candidates include liberal businessman João Doria (PSDB) in São Paulo and licensed bishop Marcelo Crivella (PRB) in Rio de Janeiro. The elections also took place after the impeachment of Dilma Rousseff and during the investigations of Operation Car Wash. However, it only affected the left-wing Workers' Party, with its reduction of elected mayors, while the centre-right Brazilian Democratic Movement Party and Progressive Party, with the most of its members investigated, had an increase of elected candidates.

Results in capitals

References

Municipal elections in Brazil
October 2016 events in South America
2016 elections in Brazil